The open-mid back rounded vowel, or low-mid back rounded vowel, is a type of vowel sound, used in some spoken languages. The IPA symbol is a turned letter c and both the symbol and the sound are commonly called "open-o". It also represents the symbol, which can be remembered as an o which has been "opened" by removing part of the closed circular shape.

In English, the symbol  (or ) is typically associated with the vowel in "thought", but in Received Pronunciation (standard British English), Australian English, New Zealand English and South African English that vowel is produced with considerably stronger lip rounding and higher tongue position than that of cardinal , i.e. as close-mid  or somewhat lower. Open-mid  or even open  realizations are found in North American English (where this vowel is often indistinguishable from the open back unrounded vowel in "bra") and Scottish English as well as Hiberno-English, Northern England English and Welsh English, though in the last three accent groups closer, -like realizations are also found. In RP, the open-mid realization of  has been obsolete since the 1930s. Pronouncing that vowel as such is subject to correction for non-native speakers aiming at RP.

In Received Pronunciation and Australian English, the open-mid back rounded vowel occurs as the main allophone of the  vowel .

Features

Occurrence

See also
 Copyleft symbol
 Index of phonetics articles
 R-colored vowel

Notes

References

External links
 

Open-mid vowels
Back vowels
Rounded vowels